Thermolithobacteria is a class of rod-shaped Gram-positive bacteria within phylum Bacillota.  Species within this class are thermophilic lithotrophs isolated from sediment in Calcite Springs in Yellowstone National Park.  Thermolithobacter ferrireducens strain JW/KA-2(T) metabolism consists of the oxidation of hydrogen gas and reduction of ferric oxide to magnetite. Thermolithobacter carboxydivorans strain R1(T) is hydrogenic and oxidizes carbon monoxide.

References

External links
 Class Thermolithobacteria. List of Prokaryotic names with Standing in Nomenclature. Retrieved: November 4, 2014.
Class Thermolithobacteria. National Center for Biotechnology Information. Retrieved: November 4, 2014.

Bacillota
Bacteria classes